Rider without a Horse is a Namibian short film directed by Tim Huebschle in 2008.

Plot 
Namibia celebrates its 18th Independence anniversary. The 100-year-old Rider Monument (Reiterdenkmal) comes to life. The rider is confronted with what he stands for and decides to change that.

Production Notes 
After the film's initial release in April 2009, director Tim Huebschle filmed some more documentary shots during the removal of the Reiterdenkmal in August 2009 which were subsequently edited into the end credits of the film.

The screenplay was written in 2008 amidst the political debate of what to do with the controversial German colonial Reiterdenkmal. Rider without a Horse received a production grant from the now defunct Berlin-Windhoek arts organization p.ART.ners.

Cast 
 Friedrich-Wilhelm Prozinsky as Reiter
 Howarth Katambo as Herero Field Marshall

References 

Films set in Namibia
Namibian short films
2009 films
Films shot in Namibia
Namibian drama films